Bacchisa fasciata is a species of beetle in the family Cerambycidae. It was described by Schwarzer in 1931. It is known from the Philippines.

References

F
Beetles described in 1931